Miguel is the second album by Dalida. It contains eight songs, including her big success "Miguel". The songs "Maman, la plus belle du monde", "Quand on n'a que l'amour" and "Tu n'as pas très bon caractère", continue in a more pop style than her first album

Track listing 
Barclay – 065 042-0:

Singles 
1957 "Miguel", also as "Volume 4"
1957 "Le ranch de Maria / Tu peux tout faire de moi / Quand on n'a que l'amour / Tu n'as pas très bon caractère", also "Volume 5"

See also 
 Dalida albums discography

References

Sources 

Dalida albums
1957 albums
Barclay (record label) albums
French-language albums